Berevo-Ranobe or Berevo-sur-Ranobe is a town and commune in western Madagascar. It belongs to the district of Maintirano, which is a part of Melaky Region. The population of the commune was estimated to be approximately 8,000 in 2001 commune census.

Berevo-Ranobe has a maritime harbour. Only primary schooling is available. Farming and raising livestock provides employment for 30% and 65% of the working population.  The most important crop is rice, while other important products are coconuts, cassava and seeds of catechu.  Additionally fishing employs 5% of the population.

References and notes 

Populated places in Melaky